The Social Highwayman is a 1926 American silent comedy film directed by William Beaudine.

Cast
 John Patrick as Jay Walker
 Dorothy Devore as Elsie Van Tyler
 Montagu Love as Ducket Nelson
 Russell Simpson as The Mayor's Partner
 George C. Pearce as Old Van Tyler (as George Pearce)
 Lynn Cowan as Bobbie
 James Gordon as Editor
 Frank Brownlee as Simpson
 Fred Kelsey as Chief of Police
 Charles Hill Mailes as The Mayor

References

External links
 

1926 films
Silent American comedy films
American silent feature films
American black-and-white films
Films directed by William Beaudine
1926 comedy films
1920s American films